Kevin Keefe (born April 30, 1967 in Moncton, New Brunswick) is a Canadian curler from Fredericton, New Brunswick. He represented New Brunswick at two Tim Hortons Brier's in 1998 and 2021.

Career
Keefe won the 1998 New Brunswick Tankard as lead for Terry Odishaw. His team of Odishaw, Tommy Sullivan and Mark Dobson represented New Brunswick at the 1998 Labatt Brier in Winnipeg, Manitoba where they finished with a 4–7 record. Four years later, he played in the 2003 Canadian Mixed Curling Championship as second for Wayne Tallon, finishing with a 6–6 record.

Keefe was selected to be Team James Grattan's alternate at the 2021 Tim Hortons Brier in Calgary, Alberta. There, they finished with a 4–4 record.

Personal life
Keefe works as a business development manager at Capital Foodservice. He has three children, Emma, Danielle and Katherine.

Teams

References

External links

1967 births
Living people
Canadian male curlers
Curlers from New Brunswick
Sportspeople from Fredericton
Sportspeople from Moncton